Johnson Huang (born 22 October 1974) is a Taiwanese racing driver currently competing in the TCR Asia Series. Having previously competed in the Audi R8 LMS Cup and Porsche Carrera Cup Asia amongst others.

Racing career
Huang began his career in 2012 in the Taiwan Super TTCC & TSSL Series'. In 2013 he switched to the Taiwan Speed Festival, where he won the GT-B class. From 2014-15 he raced in the Audi R8 LMS Cup and Porsche Carrera Cup Asia.

In October 2015 it was announced that he would race in the TCR Asia Series & TCR International Series, driving a SEAT León Cup Racer for Roadstar Racing.

Racing record

Complete TCR International Series results
(key) (Races in bold indicate pole position) (Races in italics indicate fastest lap)

References

External links
 

1974 births
Living people
TCR Asia Series drivers
TCR International Series drivers
Taiwanese racing drivers
24H Series drivers